93.3 Radyo Serbisyo (DWGQ 93.3 MHz) is an FM station owned and operated by Gumaca Communications and Management Services, the media arm of the Municipal Government of Gumaca. Its studios and transmitter are located at the 2nd Floor, Hernandez Bldg., Maharlika Highway, Brgy. Tabing Dagat, Gumaca.

References

External links
Radyo Serbisyo FB Page
Radyo Serbisyo Website

Radio stations in Lucena, Philippines
Radio stations established in 2016